Selenidioides are a genus of parasitic alveolates in the phylum Apicomplexa. Species in this genus infect marine invertebrates.

Taxonomy

The order Archigregarinorida was redefined by Levine in 1971. This reorganisation lead to the creation of two new families (Exoschizonidae and Selenidioididae) and several genera including Selenidioides.

There are 11 species in this genus.

Life cycle

The parasites in the genus infect the gastrointestinal tract and are presumably transmitted by the orofaecal route but the details of this mechanism are presently unknown.

References

Apicomplexa genera